Bill Hosket may refer to:

Bill Hosket Sr. (1911–1956), basketball player
Bill Hosket Jr. (born 1946), basketball player